Euchomenella thoracica is a species of mantis in the family Deroplatyidae. It is found on the Sunda Islands in Indonesia.

References 

Deroplatyinae
Insects described in 1842
Insects of Indonesia